"Waitin' in Your Welfare Line" is a 1966 single by Buck Owens. The single was Owens' tenth number one on the U.S. country music chart. "Waitin' in Your Welfare Line" spent seven weeks at the top and a total of eighteen weeks on the country chart.

Chart performance

References
 

1966 singles
Buck Owens songs
Songs written by Buck Owens
Song recordings produced by Ken Nelson (American record producer)
Songs written by Nat Stuckey
Songs written by Don Rich
Capitol Records singles
1966 songs